Bash Mahalleh-ye Lavandevil (also Romanized as Bāsh Maḩalleh-ye Lavandevīl; also known as Bāsh Maḩalleh) is a village in Chelevand Rural District, Lavandevil District, Astara County, Gilan Province, Iran. At the 2006 census, its population was 1,299, in 298 families.

Language 
Linguistic composition of the village.

References 

Populated places in Astara County

Azerbaijani settlements in Gilan Province

Talysh settlements in Gilan Province